BKV Norrtälje is a Swedish football club located in Norrtälje.

Background
Bollklubben Vargarna were founded in 1933, the club's name being changed to Bollklubben Vargarna Norrtälje in 1993. The team plays in red shirts and blue shorts and in recent times has enjoyed several seasons in Division 3 Norra Svealand which is the fifth tier of Swedish football.

Since their foundation BKV Norrtälje has participated mainly in the middle and lower divisions of the Swedish football league system. The club currently plays in Division 2 Norra Svealand which is the fourth tier of Swedish football, having gained promotion from Division 3 at the end of the 2010 season. The club played a few seasons in Division 2 Östra Svealand in the 1990s. They play their home matches at the Sportcentrum in Norrtälje.

BKV Norrtälje are affiliated to the Upplands Fotbollförbund.

Season to season

Attendances

In recent seasons BKV Norrtälje have had the following average attendances:

Footnotes

External links
 BKV Norrtälje – Official website
 BKV Norrtälje – Men's football
 BKV Norrtälje Facebook

 
Sport in Stockholm County
Football clubs in Stockholm County
Association football clubs established in 1933
1933 establishments in Sweden